Taounza is a small town and rural commune in Azilal Province of the Tadla-Azilal region of Morocco. At the time of the 2004 census, the commune had a total population of 11610 people living in 1753 households.

References

Populated places in Azilal Province
Rural communes of Béni Mellal-Khénifra